Maitland B. Bleecker (25 January 1903 – 19 October 2002) was an American inventor and author who was instrumental in modern helicopter design. Bleecker also holds a number of other patents, one including a boat launching device and another for a reaction propulsion device.

Biography
Bleecker graduated from University of Michigan in 1924 and secured a position with National Advisory Committee for Aeronautics at Langley Field, VA.  He then joined Curtiss Aeroplane Division where he developed and constructed a prototype helicopter known as the Curtiss-Bleecker SX-5-1 Helicopter at Garden City, NY.  This helicopter flew successfully, but the project was abandoned because of The Great Depression.

In 1937 he founded  Atlantic Casting and Engineering Corporation and retired in 1945.

Upon his retirement, he purchased  of land near West Milford, N.J. where he constructed Lake Sonoma, started a trout hatchery, and operated the Tapawingo Fishing Preserve. This area is now a part of Norvin Green State Forest.

References

External links
 Popular Science, Sept 1930 P. 20
 Modern Mechanix Magazine, Sept. 1930, Pg. 170
 Time Magazine, Nov. 7 1927
 Suburban Trends
 Maitland B. Bleecker Patents

Aircraft designers
American aerospace engineers
University of Michigan College of Engineering alumni
1903 births
2002 deaths
20th-century American engineers
20th-century American inventors